Carmen Elena Figueroa Rodríguez is a Salvadoran beauty pageant winner and politician.

Miss Universe '75
Figueroa was El Salvador's representative to the Miss Universe Pageant in 1975 and placed in the top 12, the first time a Salvadoran was placed in the semifinals since Maribel Arrieta in 1955.

Legislative Assembly
She was elected to the El Salvador National Assembly in 2006 where she is currently the Deputy for the party ARENA. Figueroa is married and has two sons. Her father, Carlos Humberto Figueroa, was a colonel in the Salvadoran military. Through him, she is of Spanish descent.

References

1950s births
Living people
Miss Universe 1975 contestants
Salvadoran people of French descent
Salvadoran politicians
Miss El Salvador winners
Beauty queen-politicians
20th-century Salvadoran women
21st-century Salvadoran women